Harvey Medical College was a co-educational night school in Chicago, Illinois that offered training in various medical fields. 

Harvey Medical College was one of over 20 medical schools that opened in Chicago between 1890 and 1910, but unlike many of these it offered a real education and was not just a diploma mill.

References

Sources
Journal of the American Medical Association Vol. 27, No. 22, 28 November 1896
Chicatgo Encyclopedia article on Medical education

Defunct private universities and colleges in Illinois
Medical schools in Illinois